Dragoș Gheorghe (born 10 January 1999) is a Romanian professional footballer who plays as a midfielder for Liga II club CSA Steaua București.

Career
Gheorghe made his senior debut for Astra Giurgiu on 4 November 2019, being brought on for Constantin Budescu in the 84th minute of a 4–0 Liga I victory over Politehnica Iași. On 31 July 2021, he scored his first goal for the club in a 1–2 Liga II loss to Metaloglobus București.

On 13 January 2022, Gheorghe moved to rival side Petrolul Ploiești on a one-and-a-half-year loan deal.

Honours
Astra Giurgiu
Cupa României runner-up: 2020–21

Petrolul Ploiești
Liga II: 2021–22

References

External links
 

1999 births
Living people
Sportspeople from Ploiești
Romanian footballers
Association football midfielders
Liga I players
Liga II players
Liga III players
FC Astra Giurgiu players
FC Petrolul Ploiești players
CSA Steaua București footballers